is a rechargeable contactless smart card ticketing system for public transit in Hiroshima Prefecture, Japan. Its name is a portmanteau of pass, happy, and speedy. Like other electronic fare collection systems in Japan, the card uses an RFID technology developed by Sony known as FeliCa, but was the first to employ an 8 KB capacity instead of the standard 4, owing to the need for more capacity to interoperate with the Hiroshima bus system.

Uniquely, while the PASPY system accepts numerous IC cards from across Japan, PASPY cards cannot be used on in other areas.

History
The system was conceived as an alternative to the magnetic fare system in place since 1994, which by 2008 was already beginning to show signs of wear; machines were needing to be replaced and customers preferred IC cards over magnetic fare cards.  The PASPY card launched with eight issuing companies, each with their own uniquely colored card, on January 26, 2008.

On March 1, the PASPY system also began accepting JR West's ICOCA card, but without allowing PASPY to be used at ICOCA terminals.  This was seen as an expedient way to avoid having to obtain agreement from the entire ICOCA service area to have local campaigns and promotional discounts to entice Hiroshima residents to use the PASPY card, while still allowing for travelers from outside the area to use the more widely accepted ICOCA card and visit Hiroshima without having to purchase a PASPY.

Operators accepting PASPY
Those with a color in the "Card color" column issue the cards, while others just accept them.

References

External links 
  Official website

Bibliography

Fare collection systems in Japan
Contactless smart cards